The 2013 United Football League Cup was the fifth edition of the United Football League Cup. The competition started on October 12 and finished on December 5, 2013.

Stallion were the defending champions.

The UFL Cup opens the new season with the launching of its Fantasy Football Games after UFL has signed a three-year partnership with FanXT. Also, UFL has announced that it has undergone partnership with low-cost airline Tigerair Philippines which will serve as their Official Airline for a year.

On December 5, 2013, Loyola Meralco Sparks defeated Pachanga Diliman with a 3–2 scoreline to win their first ever UFL Cup.

Competition format
In this edition of UFL Cup, total of 27 clubs will compete for the cup after the pullout of Division 1 team Manila Nomads citing the five-foreigners-on-the-field rule issue. This year will also see the return of Cebu Queen City United to the cup competition along with the 8 guest/invited clubs which include the defending PFF National Men's Club Championship titleholders Ceres. The groups with five teams will see their top three enter the knockout round-of-16 stage, while the groups with four clubs will have their top two assured of passage, plus the best third-placer.

From the 27-team competition, it was later reduced to 23 teams after Division 1 team Pasargad together with three guest/invited clubs Manila Tala FC, Mendiola United and Manila Hurricanes FC decided to withdraw their participation in the Cup citing their inability to field a competitive team. Due to their withdrawal to the tournament, the UFL redrawn teams and the format of having 6 groups was changed to 5 wherein five teams comprised groups A, C and E while four teams were featured in groups B and D. The top three teams of each group will be advancing to the Knockout Round-of-16 stage and the highest ranked fourth-placed team among the five groups will be the sixteenth team to qualify.

Rules on foreign players
For the 2013/14 UFCA (UFL) Football Season, the UFL Executive Committee has decided to implement a Foreign Player Rule. A club may only field in a maximum of five foreign players on the pitch at any given time. Of the six remaining players on the pitch, two may still be foreigners provided that they are permanent residents of the Philippines for at least five years.

Group stage

All times are Philippine Standard Time (PST) – UTC+8.

Group A

Group B

Group C

Group D

Group E

Ranking of Groups' Fourth-placed team
The best ranked fourth-placed team among the groups will qualify for the Knock-out Round-of-16 Stage. In the groups of 5, the matches between the 4th placed and the bottom-placed team were not considered for games played calculation.

They are determined by the parameters in this order:
 Highest number of points
 Goal difference
 Highest number of goals scored (goals for)

Knockout stage

Round of 16

Quarter-finals

Semi-finals

Third-place playoff

Final

Loyola Meralco Sparks-Blue Guards match

Last  October 30, 2013, Loyola Meralco Sparks and Blue Guards played each other in the tournament at the Emperador Stadium, Fort Bonifacio, Taguig, Philippines. It surpassed the largest winning margin in international association football which is a 31–0 victory of Australia against American Samoa and three goals shy of a 36–0 win of Arbroath over Bon Accord.

Loyola defeated Blue Guards by a margin of 33 goals making a new record and the most lopsided match in the history of the United Football League since it began a semi-professional league in 2009.

The match has received many reactions. Many suggested that there must be a screening next year for new clubs.

Top goalscorers

Correct as of 11:30, December 5, 2013

Awards
The following were the competition’s top individual awardees.

Golden Gloves:  Baba Sampana (Loyola)
Golden Boot:  Phil Younghusband (Loyola)
Golden Ball:  Phil Younghusband (Loyola)
Fair Play Awards: Global

References

Cup
United Football League Cup seasons